The Coupe de Côte d'Ivoire de football, in English Côte d'Ivoire Cup or Ivory Coast Cup, is the top knockout tournament in Ivorian football. It was created in 1960.

Winners
Previous winners are:

References

Football competitions in Ivory Coast
National association football cups